Waldemar Kita (born 1953) is a Polish millionaire businessman residing in France.

Optics
Kita was born in Szczecin, Poland. He made his fortune by establishing Cornéal in 1986. The company grew to become the foremost French, and fourth largest European firm designing and manufacturing intraocular lenses for cataract surgery and in the treatment of glaucoma. In December 2006, Kita sold Cornéal to Allergan for €180 million.

Football
Kita is a passionate football fan and in 1998 he bought Swiss club FC Lausanne-Sport, which he led as chairman up until 2001, when he sold the club again.

In 2007, he then bought Ligue 1 club FC Nantes, an eight-time French football champion. Kita reportedly paid around €10 million for the at the time financially strained club. He has been the chairman of the club ever since.

He was chosen as the best executive in French Football in 2014 by the prestigious magazine France Football.

See also
List of Poles

References 

1953 births
Living people
Polish businesspeople
Polish expatriates in France
French football chairmen and investors
People named in the Panama Papers